LCL can mean:

Science, technology, and medicine 
 Lateral collateral ligament (disambiguation), one of several ligaments located on the lateral side of a joint:
 Fibular collateral ligament, a ligament of the knee joint
 Lateral collateral ligament of ankle joint
 Radial collateral ligament of elbow joint
 Less than container load, a service of freight forwarders for part loads in shared container
 Less-than-car load freight, less than a full boxcar or box motor
 Liquid crystal laser
 Lifted condensation level or lifting condensation level, a meteorological term
 Lazarus Component Library, the Lazarus GUI subsystem, similar to Borland VCL
 Lower control limit, a statistical process control term
 Lymphoblastoid cell line, the outcome of lymphocyte infection by Epstein–Barr virus
 Light Center Length, the distance between the center of the filament (or arc tube) and a reference plane - usually the bottom of the lamp base

Organizations 
 LCL S.A., the new name of Crédit Lyonnais, a French bank
 League of Legends Continental League
 Lee County Library (Georgia)
 Liberal and Country League, a political party in Australia
 Lincoln City Libraries, the public library system of Lincoln, Nebraska
 Loblaw Companies Limited, a food retailer in Canada

Fiction 
 Li C Lik-cheung (李氏力場), a conspiracy theory of a force field located above the area of Hong Kong, invented and built by Li Ka-shing for the purpose of preventing typhoons from negatively effecting the locality
 Lights, Camera, Lexi! a Disney show
 LCL, source of life, an orange fluid said to be carrying all of the vital elements necessary to make organisms live in Neon Genesis Evangelion

Other 
 Loeb Classical Library, a series of Greek and Latin texts with English translations
 Labor Contract Law, a 2008 Chinese law intended to protect workers